Disha Pandey (born 17 January) is an Indian actress and model. She has appeared in films in Tamil, notably in the commercial success, Thamizh Padam (2010), and in Telugu and Hindi.

Early life
In comments published in a 2011 article in The New Indian Express, Pandey shared that her father was a gazette officer with the education department, and that her mother worked with Hindustan Copper. She also revealed that she has one older sister and a younger brother.

Pandey was in class 12 when she entered films, but was advised to pursue her degree before continuing acting. Despite choosing biology with mathematics in class 12, Disha decided to pursue arts to be able to complete her degree more easily. In 2011, she reported that she completed her first year BA in Human Rights.

Career
Pandey has done modelling for commercials, including for Prince Jewellery and Amul Lassi.

Pandey achieved initial success as an actress in the successful comedy film Thamizh Padam (2010).

She acted in Mayanginen Thayanginen (2012), a Tamil flick opposite Nitin Sathya and Moksha (2013), a Telugu horror film, directed by Srikanth Vemulapalli. In Mayanginen Thayanginen she played the character of a very homely girl — a customer care executive employed with a call taxi company.

She made her Kannada debut in Jai Lalitha (2014), the Kannada remake of the Malayalam hit Mayamohini (2012). She plays the role that Malayalam actress Mythili played in the original. She has appeared in another Kannada films Bombay Mittai (2015), in which she plays a character interested in travelling and photography.

Filmography

Notes

References

External links

 

Living people
Year of birth missing (living people)
Place of birth missing (living people)
21st-century Indian actresses
Actresses from Rajasthan
Actresses in Hindi cinema
Actresses in Kannada cinema
Actresses in Tamil cinema
Actresses in Telugu cinema
Female models from Rajasthan
Indian film actresses